Place Colette is a square in the 1st arrondissement of Paris, France.

Location and access
The square is bordered to the north and east by wings of the Palais-Royal (containing, to the north, the Comédie-Française and to the east, the Conseil d'État), to the south by the rue Saint-Honoré and to the west by the rue de Richelieu.

It was redesigned by Jean-Michel Othoniel as the Kiosque des noctambules (Kiosk of the night-walkers), completed in October 2000 for the centenary of the Métro.

History
Place Colette had no name (it was simply part of the rue Saint-Honoré) until 1966 when it was named after the writer Colette following a request by her only daughter, Colette de Jouvenel, to André Malraux who was then Minister of Culture.

Film location
The café "Le Nemours", in the façade of the Conseil d'État, has been used as a location for several films: 
Conversations with My Gardener (2007)
The Tourist (2010)
The Intouchables (2011)

References

Colette
Buildings and structures in the 1st arrondissement of Paris
Colette